Kurbin District was one of the 36 districts of Albania, which were dissolved in July 2000 and replaced by 12 newly created counties. It is in the west of the country, and its capital was the town of Laç.

Administrative divisions
The district consisted of the following municipalities:
Fushë-Kuqe
Laç
Mamurras
Milot

Note: - urban municipalities in bold

References

Districts of Albania
Geography of Lezhë County